The WWE Raw Women's Championship is a women's professional wrestling world championship created and promoted by the American promotion WWE, defended on the Raw brand division. It is one of two women's world titles for WWE's main roster,  along with the WWE SmackDown Women's Championship on SmackDown. The current champion is Bianca Belair, who is in her first reign.

Introduced as the WWE Women's Championship on April 3, 2016, at WrestleMania 32, it replaced the Divas Championship and has a unique title history, separate from WWE's original Women's Championship and the Divas Championship. Charlotte Flair, then known simply as Charlotte, was the inaugural champion. As a result of the 2016 draft, the championship became exclusive to Raw with a subsequent rename and SmackDown created the SmackDown Women's Championship as a counterpart title. The Raw Women's Championship was the first women's title to headline a WWE pay-per-view event at Hell in a Cell in 2016. It also headlined WWE's only all-female event, Evolution in 2018, and, along with the SmackDown Women's Championship, was also defended in the main event match of WWE's flagship event WrestleMania in 2019.

History 

On April 3, 2016, WWE Hall of Famer Lita appeared during the WrestleMania 32 pre-show:  after recapping the history of women's professional wrestling in WWE, she declared that WWE's women would no longer be referred to as WWE Divas, but as "WWE Superstars" like their male counterparts. The term "Diva" had been criticized by some commentators, fans, and several past and present female wrestlers, including reigning Divas Champion Charlotte, as diminishing the athletic abilities of female wrestlers and relegating them to "eye candy". Lita also unveiled a new title belt and revealed that the Divas Championship would be retired in favor of a new WWE Women's Championship. The inaugural champion was determined by a triple threat match between Charlotte, Becky Lynch, and Sasha Banks later that night, which was originally scheduled for the Divas Championship. Charlotte, the final Divas Champion, became the first WWE Women's Champion by winning that match.

Following the reintroduction of the brand split in July 2016, reigning champion Charlotte was drafted to the Raw brand, making the championship exclusive to Raw. It was subsequently renamed to Raw Women's Championship after SummerSlam in August, when SmackDown created the SmackDown Women's Championship as a counterpart title. The NXT Women's Championship would become WWE's third main women's title when the NXT brand, formerly the promotion's developmental territory, became WWE's third major brand in September 2019 when it was moved to the USA Network.

When the title was introduced, it shared its name with the original Women's Championship. However, the new title does not share the same title history as the original, which was unified with the Divas Championship in 2010, with the combined title inheriting the latter's lineage and history. WWE acknowledges the original championship as its predecessor, and notes that the lineage of female champions dates back to The Fabulous Moolah's reign in 1956.

The championship was the first women's title to be defended in a WWE pay-per-view main event, which was at Hell in a Cell in October 2016; this was also the first-ever women's Hell in a Cell match and the first women's match to main event a WWE pay-per-view. At the event, Charlotte (whose ring name was lengthened to Charlotte Flair) defeated Sasha Banks to become a three-time champion. After two years, it was again featured in the main event match of a pay-per-view, which was the first-ever all-women's pay-per-view Evolution in October 2018, where Ronda Rousey retained the title against Nikki Bella. Rousey then defended the title in a winner takes all triple threat match against SmackDown Women's Champion Charlotte Flair and Becky Lynch in the main event of WrestleMania 35 in April 2019, which Lynch won. This was the first women's match to main event a WrestleMania – WWE's flagship event.
On May 10, 2020, the championship became the first in history to be directly rewarded as a result of winning the Money in the Bank ladder match (taped April 15, 2020), which was revealed when the briefcase was opened by Becky Lynch the following night on Raw. Lynch announced that she was forfeiting the title due to pregnancy and announced the Money in the Bank match winner, Asuka, as the new champion.

Brand designation history 
When the championship was unveiled, there was no brand division as that had ended in August 2011. From its inception until the reintroduction of the brand extension in July 2016, reigning champion Charlotte defended the title on both Raw and SmackDown. As its name implies, the championship is for the Raw brand. However, the title is still eligible to switch brands during the annual WWE Draft.

Championship belt design 
The Raw Women's Championship belt is similar in appearance to the WWE Championship belt (introduced in 2013, with the exception of the logo change a year later), with a few notable differences. The strap is smaller for the women, and white, as opposed to black. The die-cut WWE logo in the center plate sits on a red background, as opposed to a black one. The small print below the logo reads "Women's Champion". Gold divider bars separate the center plate from the belt's two side plates. In what has become a prominent feature of the majority of WWE's championship belts, the side plates feature a removable center section, which can be customized with the champion's logo; the default side plates feature the WWE logo on a red globe. This was the first women's title in WWE with customizable side plates.

In what has become a tradition since fall 2014, WWE has presented custom WWE Championship belts to winners in both male and female professional sports with the side plates commemorating the achievement. In September 2018, WWE began presenting custom Raw Women's Championship belts to winners in just female sports. The first of these was given to the Seattle Storm for winning the 2018 WNBA Finals. Custom Raw Women's Championship belts have since been presented to the United States Women's National Soccer Team for winning the 2019 FIFA Women's World Cup, a team that previously received a custom WWE Championship for this feat in 2015, to Bianca Andreescu for winning the 2019 Women's US Open, and to the Chicago Sky for winning the 2021 WNBA Finals.

Reigns 

Charlotte Flair, then known simply as Charlotte, was the inaugural champion. She also has the most reigns at six. Becky Lynch's first reign is the longest at 373 days (398 days as recognized by WWE due to tape delay), while Flair's fifth reign is the shortest at 22 hours. Lynch also has the longest combined reign at 535 days (560 days as recognized by WWE). Asuka is the oldest champion, winning the title at the age of 38, while Sasha Banks is the youngest when she won the title at 24 years, 181 days old.

Bianca Belair is the current champion in her first reign. She won the title by defeating Becky Lynch during Night 1 of WrestleMania 38 on April 2, 2022 in Arlington, Texas.

Notes

References

External links 

 Official Raw Women's Title History

WWE Raw
WWE women's championships